The  Indian Association of Clinical Cardiologists, also known as IACC, is a non-profit association for non invasive cardiologists based in Kerala. The association works towards prevention of Cardiovascular Diseases (CVD) and the eradication of cardio-vascular mortality in rural India. It was established in the year 2008 by Dr. Rajesh Rajan, 4 Padma Shri Doctors ( like Padma Bhushan Dr. Devi Prasad Sheetty and Padma Shri Dr. Govindan Vijayaraghavan), Mohammed Shafiq and five other colleagues from Kerala Institute of Medical Sciences.

Affiliations and Activities 
It is affiliated to the European Society of Cardiovascular Surgery, American College of Cardiology and American Heart Association.  It has worked with the World Heart Federation to raise awareness among the people about cardiovascular diseases and nutrition diets. It has also worked towards increasing awareness about the co-relation between cardiovascular diseases and the environment.

The association had a rather public disagreement with the Indian College of Cardiology, the Cardiological Society of India, and the Kerala Heart Rhythm Society in 2015.  The other organisations claimed that it was illegal and unethical that MBBS doctors with a Postgraduate Diploma in Clinical Cardiology were practising as cardiologists. The association said that though the diploma was not recognised by the Medical Council of India it was recognised by the American College of Cardiology and the European Society of Cardiology. which they later disapproved following intimations from Indian authorities. Supreme Court has banned this qualification and issued orders that IGNOU stop this course

Conferences 
The first zonal conference of IACC Cardiozone 2015 was held in Kozhikode, Kerala in July 2015. The meeting was attended by international clinical cardiologists, general physicians, and medical students.

U.T. Khader, then Minister for Health and Family Welfare of Karnataka, attended their 4th national conference in 2013.

In 2016, a conference organised by Gruppo Ospedaliero San Donato (Milan) and supported by the IACC took place in Dubai. The event focused on interdisciplinary approaches in cardiac care.

IACCCON 
The National Annual Conference of Indian Association of Clinical Cardiologists (IACCCON) is a yearly event organised by the IACC and is one of the largest conference for clinical cardiology in India. The objective of the conference is to establish a program to train a larger number of graduates in clinical cardiology to deal with the early recognition, management and prevention of cardiovascular diseases and associated diseases like diabetes and hypertension.

The list of IACCCON conferences conducted by IACC is as follows:

References 

Organizations established in 2008
Medical associations based in India